Acleris osthelderi is a species of moth of the family Tortricidae. It is found in Syria.

References

Moths described in 1949
osthelderi
Moths of Asia